is an actress and model born on 3 February 1955 in Ōtsu, Shiga Prefecture, Japan. She attended Chukyo University, but left before finishing. She is employed by the From First Production talent agency. Karasuma made her debut as a Clarion Girl in 1980, moving quickly into the gravure idol scene. Her debut as a film actress came as she got the lead role in the 1980 adaptation of the Hiroyuki Itsuki novel .

Filmography

Film
Listed chronologically with oldest at top.

Kaichōon (Sachiko Yoshii, 1980, ATG)
Four Seasons・Natsuko (Natsuko, 1980, Toei)
Manon (Mitsuko, 1981, Toho)
Station (Yoshimatsu, 1981, Toho)
Sukkari...sono Ki de (Sachiko Kasuga, 1981, Toho)
Make Up (Mami, 1987)
Mishima: A Life in Four Chapters (1985)
Twilight of the Cockroaches (Momoko, 1987, Herald Ace)
Harōbari Nezumi (1991, Daei)
Hokui 15° no Duo (Japanese woman living in Manila, 1991)
Kiseki no Yama: Sayōnara Meiken Heiji (Keiko Kanō, 1992, Toho)
Minami no Shima ni Yuki ga Furu (Tomomi Kanoya, 1995, Rebirth Films)
Young Thugs: Nostalgia (1998)
Haha no Iru Basho・Taifū Ikka (Michiko, 2004, Kaeru Cafe)
Parōre (Sachiko, 2004, K&M)
Hisao (2004)
Ta ga Tame ni (2005, Pal Entertainment)
Sō Kamoshirenai (2006, Synergy)
Matsugane Ransha Jiken (2007)
The Truth about Nanjing (2007)
The Crimes That Bind (2018)
 You've Got a Friend (2022)

<small>Sources:

Television
Scarlet (2020)

References

External links

1955 births
Japanese actresses
Japanese gravure idols
Living people
People from Ōtsu, Shiga